Pawnee Rock is a city in Barton County, Kansas, United States.  As of the 2020 census, the population of the city was 193.

History
Pawnee Rock was founded in 1874. It was named from the historic landmark Pawnee Rock nearby. Pawnee Rock was incorporated in 1887.

Pawnee Rock State Historic Site
One-half mile north of U.S. 56 and the town of Pawnee Rock is Pawnee Rock State Historic Site, a monument to travellers on the Santa Fe trail. It marks the approximate halfway point on the Santa Fe Trail. The monument consists of a rough stone pole building used for picnics and a granite pillar shaped monument atop a small hill.

Geography
Pawnee Rock is located at  (38.265283, -98.982614).

While located in Barton Country, the south edge of Pawnee Rock lies along the Barton / Pawnee county line.

Demographics

2010 census
As of the census of 2010, there were 252 people, 107 households, and 71 families living in the city. The racial makeup of the city was 96.0% White, 0.4% Native American, 0.4% from other races, and 3.2% from two or more races. Hispanic or Latino of any race were 2.4% of the population.

There were 107 households, of which 30.8% had children under the age of 18 living with them, 46.7% were married couples living together, 14.0% had a female householder with no husband present, 5.6% had a male householder with no wife present, and 33.6% were non-families. 29.0% of all households were made up of individuals, and 9.3% had someone living alone who was 65 years of age or older. The average household size was 2.36 and the average family size was 2.93.

The median age in the city was 44.2 years. 25.4% of residents were under the age of 18; 5.1% were between the ages of 18 and 24; 21.2% were from 25 to 44; 37.3% were from 45 to 64; and 11.1% were 65 years of age or older. The gender makeup of the city was 54.4% male and 45.6% female.

2000 census
As of the census of 2000, there were 356 people, 131 households, and 88 families living in the city. The racial makeup of the city was 97.19% White, 0.28% African American, 0.84% Native American, 0.84% from other races, and 0.84% from two or more races. Hispanic or Latino of any race were 2.53% of the population.

There were 131 households, out of which 38.2% had children under the age of 18 living with them, 46.6% were married couples living together, 15.3% had a female householder with no husband present, and 32.1% were non-families. 26.0% of all households were made up of individuals, and 9.2% had someone living alone who was 65 years of age or older. The average household size was 2.72 and the average family size was 3.30.

In the city, the population was spread out, with 36.2% under the age of 18, 6.7% from 18 to 24, 28.1% from 25 to 44, 19.9% from 45 to 64, and 9.0% who were 65 years of age or older. The median age was 32 years. For every 100 females, there were 92.4 males. For every 100 females age 18 and over, there were 89.2 males.

The median income for a household in the city was $38,393, and the median income for a family was $39,375. Males had a median income of $25,625 versus $19,821 for females. The per capita income for the city was $12,651. About 10.6% of families and 9.6% of the population were below the poverty line, including 7.7% of those under age 18 and 7.1% of those age 65 or over.

Education
The community is served by Fort Larned USD 495 public school district.

Pawnee Rock schools were closed through school unification. The Pawnee Rock High School mascot was Pawnee Rock Braves.

See also
 Santa Fe Trail

References

Further reading

External links

 
 Pawnee Rock - Directory of Public Officials
 USD 495, local school district
 Pawnee Rock city map, KDOT

Cities in Kansas
Cities in Barton County, Kansas